The Li Na & Friends Tennis Exhibition 2011 was a one-off women's exhibition tennis tournament, held on 17 and 18 December, featuring two of the best ranked women, Li Na and Sabine Lisicki, and men's legends Pete Sampras and Carlos Moyá. It was held in Wuhan, China, and was sponsored by IMG Worldwide.

Matches

Day 1

Day 2

References

External links

Tennis tournaments in China
2011 tennis exhibitions
2011 in Chinese tennis